Sweden held an early general election to fulfil the four-year term between the regular 1956 and 1960 elections. Although the centre-right received more votes, the leftist parties won one more seat. The election was held on 1 June.

Results

Regional results

Percentage share

By votes

Constituency results

Percentage share

By votes

References

General elections in Sweden